is a railway station on the West Japan Railway Company JR Tōzai Line in Amijimacho, Miyakojima-ku, Osaka, Osaka Prefecture, Japan.

The station took over the ridership of the former Katamachi Station, which was the original terminal for the Gakkentoshi Line, now starting at Kyobashi Station. The former Keihan Main Line also had a station in the same area.

Layout
There is an island platform with two tracks.

History 
Ōsakajō-kitazume Station opened on 8 March 1997, coinciding with the opening of the JR Tōzai Line between Kyobashi and Amagasaki.

Station numbering was introduced in March 2018 with Ōsakajō-kitazume being assigned station number JR-H42.

Surroundings
Sakuramoniya Park
Japan Mint
Fujita Art Museum

References

Railway stations in Osaka Prefecture

Railway stations in Japan opened in 1997